Carlos Mauro Pereira da Silva (born 10 August 1978) also known as Mauro or Mauro Silva was a Brazilian footballer.

Biography
Mauro started his football career in lowly European teams such as KFC Eeklo, FC Naters and Delémont before joining Panathinaikos in 1998, scoring for the Greek club in the UEFA Champions League match against Arsenal.

Mauro joined OFI Crete in 1999, scoring 3 goals for the club during 2000-01 UEFA Cup: twice against Napredak and once against Slavia Prague before being released in 2001.

External links

Brazilian footballers
Brazilian expatriate footballers
Panathinaikos F.C. players
OFI Crete F.C. players
1978 births
Living people
Association football forwards